Fierce Hearts, or Fierce Hearts: the Music of Love-Song-Circus, is a soundtrack/studio album by Australian singer songwriter Katie Noonan, produced as the soundtrack to contemporary circus Circa's show Love-Song-Circus.

At the ARIA Music Awards of 2014, the album was nominated for Best Original Soundtrack/Cast/Show Album, but lost to Gurrumul: His Life and Music by Geoffrey Gurrumul Yunupingu.

Background and release
Love-Song-Circus is based on the stories of Australia’s first convict women. It combines folk instrumentation, string quartet, piano and Noonan’s voice with the three of Circa’s acrobats/aerialists.

Noonan was inspired by an exhibition at the National Museum of Australia called "Love Tokens". This collection contains 307 tokens dating from 1762-1856, most of them fashioned from the 1797 Cartwheel penny. These pennies proved perfect as tokens – they were cheap, made of a soft copper and were quite large – providing plenty of space for inscriptions. Convicts would engrave them with messages and images for the loved ones they had to leave behind.

Noonan said, "As a woman and mother I felt deeply compelled to explore these stories. I soon discovered that the lives of the first female convicts is a part of our history that has been explored by few".

Love-Song-Circus premiered at the 2012 Adelaide Cabaret Festival. It played again in Melbourne in 2013 and again in 2014 in Brisbane, Adelaide, Melbourne and Sydney.

Reception
Ali Burnie of Beat Music gave the album a positive review saying; "Fierce Hearts – The Music of Love-Song-Circus is folk music at its best. Noonan’s sublime vocals, piano and heartfelt songwriting combines seamlessly with The Gossamer String Quartet, ensuring that this album is a joy to listen to. Drawing us in from the very first track, this beautiful, yet at times very sad album is flawless from start to finish"

Track listing
 "Fierce Hearts Interlude 1" - 3:40
 "Esther" - 4:26
 "Leaden Hearts" - 6:33
 "Fierce Hearts Interlude 2" - 1:33
 "Jane" - 2:43
 "Female Transport" - 4:00
 "Fierce Hearts Interlude 3" - 3:32
 "Janet" - 3:44
 "Space Between Us" - 3:10
 "Fierce Hearts Interlude 4" - 3:36
 "Sweet One" - 4:46
 "Louisa" - 3:55
 "Leaden Hearts Reprise" - 2:03
 "Ellen" - 3:26
 "Mary" - 4:18
 "Finale" - 4:46

Credits
 Banjo, Acoustic Guitar, Electric Guitar, Resonator Guitar, Mandolin – Benjamin Hauptman
 Cello – Josephine Vains
 Double Bass – Zoe Hauptmann
 Engineer [Assistant] – Aaron Dobos
 Engineer, Mixed By – David Nicholas
 Performer – The Gossamer String Quartet
 Producer, Vocals, Piano – Katie Noonan
 Viola – Caleb Wright
 Violin [1st] – Sarah Curro
 Violin [2nd] – Monica Curro
 Written-By [Strings], Arranged By [Strings] – Stephen Newcomb

Release history

References

2014 albums
Katie Noonan albums